The Dodson Rocks are two small, dark rock exposures on the south side of Single Island, on the west side of the Amery Ice Shelf. They were discovered from an Australian National Antarctic Research Expeditions (ANARE) aircraft in 1969, photographed from an ANARE aircraft in 1971, and named for R. Dodson, senior geologist with the ANARE Prince Charles Mountains survey in 1971.

References 

Rock formations of Mac. Robertson Land